Estíbaliz may refer to:

Persons
Estíbaliz Gabilondo (born 1976), Spanish actress and journalist
Estíbaliz Martínez (born 1980), Spanish rhythmic gymnast and Olympic champion
Estíbaliz Pereira (born 1986), Spanish beauty queen
Estíbaliz Uranga (born 1952), Spanish singer, best known as a member of the folk group Mocedades, as part of the duo Sergio y Estíbaliz
Estíbaliz Urrutia (born 1970), Spanish long-distance runner

de Estíbaliz

Places
Sanctuary of Nuestra Señora de Estíbaliz, Argandoña, Spain
Villafranca de Estíbaliz, a village in Álava, Basque Country, Spain

See also
Sergio y Estíbaliz, Spanish duo